Nicholas Cook,  (born 5 June 1950) is a British musicologist and writer born in Athens, Greece. From 2009 to 2017, he was the 1684 Professor of Music at the University of Cambridge, where he is a Fellow of Darwin College. Previously, he was professorial research fellow at Royal Holloway, University of London, where he directed the Arts and Humanities Research Council Research Centre for the History and Analysis of Recorded Music (CHARM). He has also taught at the University of Hong Kong, University of Sydney, and University of Southampton, where he served as dean of arts.

He is a former editor of the Journal of the Royal Musical Association and was elected a Fellow of the British Academy in 2001.

Books
 (Edited by Patrick N. Juslin & A. Sloboda) Handbook of Music and Emotion : Theory, Research, Applications - (co-written with Nicola Dibben) Chapter 3 : Emotion in culture and history: perspectives from musicology. Oxford University Press, 2010.
 (Co-edited with Eric Clarke, Daniel Leech-Wilkinson, and John Rink) The Cambridge Companion to Recorded Music. Cambridge: Cambridge University Press, 2009.
 The Schenker Project: Culture, Race, and Music Theory in Fin-de-siècle Vienna. Oxford: Oxford University Press, 2007.
 Music, Performance, Meaning: Selected Essays. Aldershot: Ashgate, 2007.
 (Co-edited with Anthony Pople) The Cambridge History of Twentieth-Century Music. Cambridge: Cambridge University Press, 2004.
 (Co-edited with Eric Clarke) Empirical Musicology: Aims, Methods, Prospects. Oxford: Oxford University Press, 2004.
 (Co-edited with Mark Everist) Rethinking Music. Oxford: Oxford University Press, 1999.
 Music: A Very Short Introduction. Oxford: Oxford University Press, 1998.
 Analysing Musical Multimedia. Oxford: Clarendon Press, 1998.
 Beethoven: Symphony No. 9. Cambridge: Cambridge University Press, 1998.
 Music, Imagination, and Culture. Oxford: Clarendon Press, 1990.
 Musical Analysis and the Listener. New York: Garland, 1989.
 A Guide to Musical Analysis. London: Dent, 1987.

References

External links
Biography (includes list of publications)

 

 
 
 

1950 births
Living people
British musicologists
Fellows of the British Academy
Members of the University of Cambridge Faculty of Music
Fellows of Darwin College, Cambridge
Academic staff of the University of Sydney
Academics of the University of Southampton
Professors of Music (Cambridge)